Acacia boormanii (common name : Snowy River wattle) is a medium, (sometimes) suckering, multi-stemmed, copse-forming shrub, belonging to the genus Acacia.

Its native range is the Snowy River in the alpine country of south eastern Australia. It thrives best on well drained soils, but also tolerates compacted clay soils or soils with some salinity.

Description
This evergreen, frost-hardy, rounded shrub grows to a height of 4.50 m (15 feet), and a diameter of 1.80 to 3.60 m (6 – 12 feet). Its  silvery branches carry small, gray-green leaves. The narrow phyllodes are about 8 cm long.

Its inflorescence consists of lemon-yellow, globular flower heads, profusely borne in panicles, lasting four to six weeks.

This wattle is very popular in cultivation.

References

boormanii
Fabales of Australia
Flora of Victoria (Australia)
Trees of Australia